The 20th Asian Table Tennis Championships were held in Macau, China, from 23 February to 1 March 2012. It was originally organised and hosted by the Lebanese Table Tennis Federation for 12 to 18 September 2011 with the prospective location of Jamhour Stadium, Beirut, Lebanon. However, due to security deterioration in the region, the Lebanon TTF informed Asian Table Tennis Union(ATTU) that they decided to cancel hosting the 20th ATTC.

Schedule
Five individual and two team events were contested.

Medal summary

Medal table

Events

See also
2011 Asian Cup Table Tennis Tournament

References

Asian Table Tennis Championships
Asian Table Tennis Championships
Table Tennis Championships
Table tennis in Macau
Table tennis competitions in China
Asian Table Tennis Championships